Franjo baron Vlašić (Austrian: Franz Vlassits; Hungarian: Vlassich Ferenc; 24 April 1766 – 16 May 1840) was a Croatian general and ban of Croatia between 1832 and 1840.

In 1784 he began his military career. Vlašić obtained the rank of general in 1813. In 1831 he was appointed as military commander in Petrovaradin. Serbs in Petrovaradin considered General Vlašić one of their own.

He became a ban on 10 February 1832. He resisted the Magyarization of Croatia, especially the teaching of Hungarian in schools. During his rule the Croatian national revival began with the Illyrian Movement.

Following his death, he was succeeded by Juraj Haulik as acting ban.

See also
 Martin von Dedovich
 Anton Csorich
 Adam Bajalics von Bajahaza
 Andreas Karaczay
 Paul Davidovich

References

Sources
 Vlašić, Franjo at proleksis.lzmk.hr

External links 
 Short biography of Baron Vlašić at Miroslav Krleža Institute of Lexicography Encyclopedia

Bans of Croatia
Barons of Croatia
18th-century Croatian people
19th-century Croatian people
1766 births
1840 deaths
People from Dombóvár
18th-century Croatian nobility
19th-century Croatian nobility